Little Eagle (Lakota: Waŋblí Čik’ala) is a census-designated place (CDP) in Corson County, South Dakota, United States. The population was 319 at the 2010 census.

The community has the name of a Native American chieftain.

Geography

Little Eagle is located at  (45.684816, -100.801496).

Little Eagle has been assigned the ZIP code 57639.

Demographics

As of the census of 2000, there were 370 people, 71 households, and 60 families residing in the CDP. The population density was 262.9 people per square mile (101.3/km2). There were 74 housing units at an average density of 52.6/sq mi (20.3/km2). The racial makeup of the CDP was 0.54% White, 99.19% Native American, and 0.27% from two or more races. Hispanic or Latino of any race were 2.70% of the population.

There were 71 households, out of which 53.5% had children under the age of 18 living with them, 28.2% were married couples living together, 40.8% had a female householder with no husband present, and 14.1% were non-families. 9.9% of all households were made up of individuals, and 1.4% had someone living alone who was 65 years of age or older. The average household size was 5.21 and the average family size was 5.43.

In the CDP, the population was spread out, with 48.4% under the age of 18, 13.8% from 18 to 24, 24.1% from 25 to 44, 10.8% from 45 to 64, and 3.0% who were 65 years of age or older. The median age was 19 years. For every 100 females, there were 87.8 males. For every 100 females age 18 and over, there were 96.9 males.

The median income for a household in the CDP was $12,500, and the median income for a family was $11,528. Males had a median income of $20,625 versus $12,321 for females. The per capita income for the CDP was $3,632. About 75.4% of families and 73.4% of the population were below the poverty line, including 76.8% of those under age 18 and 50.0% of those age 65 or over.

Local Media

FM Radio

Notable person
Tȟatȟóka Íŋyaŋke (Running Antelope) is buried at the Long Hill Cemetery east of Little Eagle

References

Census-designated places in Corson County, South Dakota
Census-designated places in South Dakota